Holocaust 2000 (also released as The Chosen and Rain of Fire) is a 1977 horror film directed by Alberto De Martino, written by De Martino, Michael Robson, and Sergio Donati, and starring Kirk Douglas, Simon Ward, Agostina Belli, Anthony Quayle, Virginia McKenna, and Alexander Knox. The original musical score was composed by Ennio Morricone.

The British-Italian co-production was produced by Edmondo Amati for The Rank Organisation and Titanus, and is widely-considered a cash-in on the success of the similarly-themed The Omen released a year earlier. It received mixed reviews, but has become a cult classic.

Plot
Despite doomsday warnings from throngs of locals, wealthy industrialist Robert Caine makes the controversial decision to build a nuclear power plant near a sacred cave in the Middle East. However, before Caine can reap the benefits of his latest bid for global domination, he discovers that his son, Angel, is the Antichrist, who is planning to use his father's project to trigger the end of the world. As Caine digs deeper, a string of suspicious accidents occur that kill off prominent figures who criticized the project. He also notes similarities between the design of the plant and features of a biblically-prophesied beast that will herald the apocalypse. During a dream, Caine envisions the plant rising from the sea, then sees its circle of towers take on the form of a multiheaded monster.

The film was released with two endings. The European general release version of the film features an open ending, with Kirk Douglas in exile with his newborn child, and his adult son now successfully developing the plant intended to cause Armageddon.

In the shortened version released in U.S. theaters, home video, and network television, a new ending was added where Douglas returns to the company and enters a board meeting having explosives hidden on him. In the final scene, Angel's face is overlaid with an image of an explosion, showing that Robert has successfully thwarted the apocalypse. The U.S. DVD from Lionsgate retains the original darker ending and the Blu-ray from Scream Factory contains both the European and American versions of the film.

Cast

 Kirk Douglas as Robert Caine
 Simon Ward as Angel Caine
 Agostina Belli as Sara Golan
 Anthony Quayle as Professor Griffith
 Virginia McKenna as Eva Caine
 Spiros Focás as Harbin
 Ivo Garrani as The Prime Minister
 Alexander Knox as Professor Ernst Meyer
 Adolfo Celi as Dr. Kerouac
 Romolo Valli as Monsignor Charrier
 Geoffrey Keen as Dr. Howard
 Massimo Foschi as Arab Assassin
 John Carlin as Robertson
 Peter Cellier as Sheckley
 Gerard Hely as Clarke
 Penelope Horner as Caine's Secretary
 Caroline Langrishe as Carla
 Denis Lawson as Stevens
 Tony Clarkin as Megaphone Man

Reception
In contemporary reviews, the Monthly Film Bulletin referred to the film as "the wildest farrago yet to have come out of the demonology genre". The review found that "the religious allegory adds little weight to the confusion of the plot"

In a retrospective review, AllMovie described the film as a rip-off of The Omen but still "offers some creepy fun for fans of Euro-horror." The review noted unique additions to the plot such as political and corporate intrigue and the fear of nuclear energy and civil unrest in the Middle East." The review also noted De Martino, who "gives the film a glossy touch during the non-horror moments but brings plenty of verve to the shocks: his best moment is a nightmare sequence in which Douglas hallucinates the nuclear plant he is working on rising from the sea and transforming into a multi-headed hydra."

References

External links

1977 films
1970s science fiction horror films
British horror films
Italian science fiction horror films
English-language Italian films
Films directed by Alberto De Martino
Films scored by Ennio Morricone
Films with screenplays by Sergio Donati
Fictional depictions of the Antichrist
1970s English-language films
1970s British films
1970s Italian films